The Fort à la Corne Provincial Forest is a mixed-wood forest conservation area in Saskatchewan, Canada. It is east of the city of Prince Albert and just north of the James Smith First Nation. The fort takes its name for a historic Hudson's Bay Company post in the area (see Fort à la Corne for more details). Recently the area has been subject to diamond exploration by various companies including Shane Resources, United Uranium, and Shore Gold.

See also 
 List of Saskatchewan provincial forests

References 

Forests of Saskatchewan
Protected areas of Saskatchewan
Kinistino No. 459, Saskatchewan
Division No. 15, Saskatchewan